The Devonian Temple Butte Formation, also called Temple Butte Limestone, outcrops through most of the Grand Canyon of Arizona, USA; it also occurs in southeast Nevada. Within the eastern Grand Canyon, it consists of thin, discontinuous and relatively inconspicuous lenses that fill paleovalleys cut into the underlying Muav Limestone. Within the central and western Grand Canyon, the exposures are continuous. However, they tend to merge with cliffs of the much thicker and overlying Redwall Limestone.

Within the western and central parts of the Grand Canyon, the Temple Butte Formation consists of a westward thickening layer of interbedded dolomite, sandy dolomite, sandstone, mudstone, and limestone that vary in color from purple, reddish-purple, dark gray, to light-gray. Within the eastern part of the Grand Canyon, the Temple Butte Formation fills shallow paleovalleys, which are eroded into the underlying Tonto Group, (upper 3rd unit Muav Limestone). The Temple Butte strata filling these paleovalleys consist of interbedded mudstone, sandstone, dolomite, and conglomerate – that vary in color from purple, reddish-purple, to light gray. Typically, the paleovalley-fill consists of a distinct pale, reddish purple dolomite or sandy dolomite.

Contacts
The upper and lower contacts of the Temple Butte Formation are major unconformities. Within the Grand Canyon region, its base is a major unconformity within the Paleozoic rock record. The time represented by this unconfomity spans about 100 million years, including part of Late Cambrian, all of Ordovician and Silurian, and most of Early and Middle Devonian time. The upper contact is a disconformity that typically consists of nearly horizontal surfaces with little or no relief and overlain locally by a basal conglomerate within the overlying Redwall Limestone.

Frenchman Mountain
These limestone and dolomite beds represent sediments that accumulated during the period of time represented by the two disconformities that form the upper and lower contacts of the Temple Butte Formation in the Grand Canyon.

Fossils
Despite the occurrence of abundant marine invertebrate and vertebrate fossils within the laterally and temporally equivalent Jerome Member of the Martin Formation in central Arizona, the Temple Butte Formation has yielded surprisingly few identifiable fossils within its Grand Canyon outcrops. These fossils include indeterminate brachiopods, gastropods, corals and placoganoid fish from the walls of lower Kanab Canyon and fish plates identified as Bothriolepis from Sapphire Canyon. Possible cylindrical trace fossils occur in dolomite beds near the base of the Temple Butte at the type section and Tuckup Canyon. Finally, latest Givetian to late Frasnian conodonts have been recovered from the Temple Butte Formation at Matkatamiba Canyon at River Mile 148.4.

West of the Grand Canyon, fossils have been recovered from the Temple Butte Formation, where it is also known as the Sultan Limestone. From outcrops that form parts of Iceberg Ridge in Mohave County, Arizona, and the Lake Mead National Recreation Area, rare silicified corals, crinoid plates, gastropods, and massive stromatoporoid colonies have been found in dolomite outcrops of the Temple Butte Formation (Sultan Limestone).<ref name="Spamer1984a">Spamer, E.E., 1984, Paleontology in the Grand Canyon of Arizona: 125 years of lessons and enigmas from the late Precambrian to the present. Mosasaur." (Journal of the Delaware Valley Paleontological Society) 22:45–128.</ref> In addition, the upper  of the Temple Butte Formation at Iceberg Ridge contains Famennian conodonts. Finally, farther to the north in Nevada, on South Virgin Peak Ridge, an outcrop of quartz arenite and pinkish-gray sandy dolomite at the base of Temple Butte Formation, has yielded fossil fish plates identified as Holonema, Asterolepis and sarcopterygians of middle Devonian age.

See also

 Geology of the Grand Canyon area

References

Popular Publications
 Blakey, R, and W Ranney (2008) Ancient Landscapes of the Colorado Plateau. Grand Canyon Association, Grand Canyon Village, Arizona. 176 pp. 
 Chronic, H (1983) Roadside Geology of Arizona. 23rd printing, Mountain Press Publishing Company, Missoula, Montana. 332 pp. 
 Lucchitta, I (2001) Hiking Arizona's Geology.'' Mountaineers's Books, Seattle Washington. 290 pp.

External links
 Abbot, W, (2001) Revisiting the Grand Canyon – Through the Eyes of Seismic Sequence Stratigraphy. Search and Discovery Article # 40018, America Association of Petroleum Geologists, Tulsa, Oklahoma.
 Baker, R. G. (1984)  Channel filled by Temple Butte Limestone.  Iowa Digital Library, University of Iowa, Des Moines, Iowa.
 Mathis, A., and C. Bowman (2007) The Grand Age of Rocks: The Numeric Ages for Rocks Exposed within Grand Canyon, Grand Canyon National Park, Arizona, National Park Service, Grand Canyon National Park, Arizona.

Limestone formations of the United States
Natural history of the Grand Canyon
Geologic formations of Arizona
Devonian Arizona
Devonian System of North America